Automóvil Panamericano or simply Automóvil (Spanish for "Panamerican automobile") was a Mexican automotive enthusiast magazine first published in 1995. Owned by Motorpress-Televisa and partner of the German Auto, Motor und Sport. It ranked as the ninth most read magazine in Mexico, and the most read Spanish language automotive magazine in the world.

Critical testing, motor sports and buyers guidance have been a regular since its founding.

History
Originally based on the Spanish magazine Automóvil Fórmula (issued since 1978), the first issue of Automóvil Panamericano was officially released on 15 January 1995, whereas a sample #0 issue had appeared months earlier in October 1994. The layout of this first issue's cover would retain a simple style that would abide until today, presenting Automovil'''s logo on the top header, the months' featured tested car centered, further tests on the bottom and various articles elsewhere.

The first renewal of the magazine was issued in February 2002 as editorial director Ricardo Chan Robles took charge. The magazine's frame changed to black and the logo was changed, now using a bolder typography.

Sister projectsAuto Plus (initially called "Guía Util del Automóvil") was Automóvil Panamericano's sister publication, targeted at young enthusiasts and focusing on practical issues within the automotive world, short tests and a price list. It was published monthly for eight years between 2002 and 2010.Automóvil TV was the television counterpart of the magazine. It featured from 2003 to 2008 on Televisa's Galavision (Channel 9).Automóvil W is a radio program first broadcast in March 2007 in W Radio (96.9 MHz FM, 900 MHz AM & Online) of Televisa Radio.Automóvil Digital is a running online project appeared in July 2007 to distribute a digital version of the magazine to a VIP readers list.MyAutomovil.com is the online counterpart appeared for the Latin market in North America in March 2008 (WWW.MYAUTOMOVIL.COM).

Special issues
On May 15, 2003 was launched the magazine number 100th. The cover was coloured yellow and were added up to 50 pages.

The cover showed 20 exotic cars that were considered the best of the world, featuring the Pagani Zonda S, the Ferrari 550 Maranello and the Mini Cooper.

The ten-year anniversary commemorative was launched on February 15, 2005. The frame now changed to red and were added up to 30 pages. In the cover featured the Mercedes-Benz SLR McLaren. The cover had remained the same since then.

On February 15, 2010 was launched the magazine special edition the 15th anniversary.

Car of the Year
Since its first issue, Automóvil Panamericano would raffle off a brand new automobile with the Juzge su coche y gane un coche contest (Judge your car and win a car). The readers would review several aspects of their current car (if they had any) and send the answer sheet via post mail to Automóvil's headquarters in Mexico City. After the deadline, a winner would be chosen and the results of the survey would be published in the following month's issue.

However, in 1999 the contest's rules underwent a major renewal, resulting in the Best Cars of the Year'' contest, in which the favourite automobile for each category would be picked by readers, no longer having to review their own car; the contestants would send their answers via post mail as before.

Since 2003, actual silver prizes would be awarded to the people-chosen winning cars; marques would send a representative to collect the small statue at a special ceremony. Additionally, a special golden award to the Best Car of the Year (overall) would be given.

Juzge su coche y gane un coche
1995 Prize: BMW 325i
1996 Mercury Sable - Prize: Land Rover Discovery
1997 Pontiac Grand Prix - Prize: Volkswagen New Beetle
1998 Audi A6 (Mediano) - Prize: Peugeot 306

Best Cars
1999 Prize: Audi A3
2000 Prize: Volkswagen Jetta
2001 Prize: Volkswagen New Beetle Turbo
2002 Prize: Mercedes C200K Estate

Best Cars and Car of the Year
2003 Renault Mégane (Prize: Audi A3)
2004 Porsche Cayenne (Car of the Year) - Prize: Chrysler Crossfire
2005 Volkswagen Jetta (Car of the Year) - Prize: SEAT Altea
2006 Volkswagen Bora (Car of the Year) - Prize: Suzuki Grand Vitara
2007 Volkswagen Golf GTI (Car of the Year) - Prize: Audi A3 TDI
2008 Prize: Mazda Miata
2009 Audi R8 (Car of the Year) - Prize: Fiat 500 Sport
2010 Prize: Suzuki Kizashi
2011 Prize: Audi A1
2012 Prize: Volvo S60
2013 Prize: Seat Toledo
2014 Prize: Porsche Macan

Editorial direction

References

External links
Automóvil Online - official site
Motorpress Ibérica - official site
Motorpresse International - official site

1995 establishments in Mexico
Automobile magazines
Magazines published in Mexico
Magazines established in 1995
Spanish-language magazines
Monthly magazines published in Mexico